The Commission for Rural Communities (CRC) was established as a division of England's Countryside Agency on 1 April 2005, and became a non-departmental public body on 1 October 2006, following the enactment of the Natural Environment and Rural Communities Act 2006. The chairman of the commission was Stuart Burgess.

On 29 June 2010, Defra secretary Caroline Spelman announced the abolition of the Commission as part of the 2010 UK quango reforms. It was formally abolished on 31 March 2013.

References

External links
 Archive of official website prior to abolition – 21 Feb 2013

2005 establishments in the United Kingdom
2013 disestablishments in the United Kingdom
Government agencies established in 2005
Government agencies disestablished in 2013
English coast and countryside
Interested parties in planning in England
Department for Environment, Food and Rural Affairs
Defunct non-departmental public bodies of the United Kingdom government
Rural society in the United Kingdom